Cambridge Documentary Films is a non profit organization established in Massachusetts in 1974.  The purpose of the organization is to create new perspectives on important social issues and give voice to groups and individuals whose perspectives are ignored by mainstream media. Cambridge Documentary Films produces and distributes award-winning documentaries to thousands of universities, community organizations, schools, libraries and public interest organizations throughout the United States and the world. These films have won numerous awards, including an Academy Award  and have been screened at the UN General Assembly, The White House, the Office of the Vice President, the US Congress and numerous state houses. The subjects include: advertising's image of women, domestic violence, trauma, rape, eating disorders, self-esteem, media literacy, homophobia, the labor movement, gender roles, career counseling, nuclear war, reproductive health hazards, the women's health movement, gay and lesbian parenting and other social issues.

Cambridge Documentary Film titles

References

External links 
 Cambridge Documentary Films

Social issues
1974 establishments in Massachusetts
Documentary film production companies
Educational films
Film production companies of the United States
Film distributors of the United States